W. P. Carey Inc. is a real estate investment trust that invests in properties leased to single tenants via NNN leases. The company is organized in Maryland, with its primary office in New York City.

As of December 31, 2019, the company owned 1,214 properties in 25 countries leased to 345 tenants. Approximately 64% of the company's revenue is derived in United States and 36% in Europe.

History
The company was founded in 1973 by William P. Carey.

In the early 1980s, the company was innovative in the use of leaseback transactions to acquire properties.

In 1982, the company acquired three Gibson manufacturing and warehouse buildings from Wesray Capital Corporation.

In March 2009, the company bought 21 floors of the 52-story New York Times Building on Eighth Avenue in Manhattan for $225 million in a leaseback transaction in which The New York Times agreed to lease space in the building for up to 15 years, while retaining the right to buy the building back in 2019 for $250 million.

In 2012, William P. Carey, the founder of the company, died. The company also merged with its non-traded real estate investment trust affiliate, Corporate Property Associates 15, and reorganized into a real estate investment trust.

In 2014, the company merged with Corporate Property Associates 16, one of its non-traded REIT affiliates. The company also acquired a portfolio of properties in Australia for $138 million in a leaseback transaction.

In 2016, the company acquired three properties leased to Nord Anglia Education for $167 million and a portfolio of properties in North America leased to ABC Group for $145 million in a leaseback transaction.

In 2017, the company stopped sponsoring non-public REITs and liquidated or began the phase-out of the funds that it managed.

In 2018, the company merged with CPA:17 - Global.

References

External links

Financial services companies established in 1973
1973 establishments in Maryland
Publicly traded companies based in New York City
Companies listed on the New York Stock Exchange
Real estate investment trusts of the United States